The 1978 EuroHockey Club Champions Cup, taking place in Barcelona, was the fifth edition of Europe's premier field hockey club competition. It was won once again by Southgate Hockey Club from London - the last of their three titles to date.

Standings
  Southgate HC
  Rüsselsheimer RK
  Real Club de Polo, Barcelona
  HC Klein Zwitserland
  Slough HC
  Uccle Sport
  Slavia Prague
  Rot-Weiss Wettingen
  Edinburgh HC
  HK Jedinstvo
  Swansea Bay HC
  Dynamo Almaty

References

See also
European Hockey Federation

EuroHockey Club Champions Cup
International field hockey competitions hosted by Catalonia
EuroHockey Club Champions Cup
EuroHockey Club Champions Cup
1978 in European sport